The following is a list of fantasy podcasts. The list contains podcasts that have been explicitly categorized as fantasy by reliable secondary sources that demonstrate each podcast's notability. The type of release can be either episodic or serial. The delivery of each podcast can vary significantly from a fully scripted audio drama to an entirely improvised skit. Other styles include conversational, interview, or narrated short stories. The contents of each podcast can vary from stories of fiction to nonfiction discussions revolving around fiction in media.

List

See also 

Fantasy
 Fantasy film
 Fantasy podcast
 Fantasy literature

Notes

References

External links 

  on FictionPodcasts.com
  on Podchaser
  on Player FM

Lists of podcasts
Fantasy-related lists